Hindu jokes are a class of ethnic jokes based on the lifestyle of the Hindus and some of the common religious beliefs in Hinduism.

Some of the most common characteristics of these jokes include satire on the priests and ascetics, and jokes on Brahmins that stereotype their defects, ritualism and conceits. 

Tolerance and respect are key element of Indian-origin religions (also called Dharma religions). Hinduism, Buddhism and Jainism, have no concept of blasphemy. In contrast, in West Asia - birth  place of Abrahamic religions (such as Islam and Christianity, there was no room for such tolerance and respect for dissent where heretics and blasphemers had to pay with their lives. Nāstika, meaning atheist or atheism, are valid and accepted streams of in Indian origin religions where Buddhism, Jainism, as well as Samkhya,  Cārvāka and Ājīvika are considered atheist school of philosophy in the Indian religions.

See also

 Blasphemy laws
 Christianity and blasphemy
 Islam and blasphemy

 Religious and ethnic jokes
 Flying Spaghetti Monster
 Parody religion
 Pathan joke
 Sardarji joke

References

Ethnic jokes
Indian humour

Criticism of Hinduism